Kaveripakkam is a town panchayat in Ranipet district in the Indian state of Tamil Nadu.

Demographics
As of the 2011 India census, Kaveripakkam had a population of 14,583. Males constitute 50% of the population and females 50%. Kaveripakkam has an average literacy rate of 72%, higher than the national average of 59.5%: male literacy is 79%, and female literacy is 64%. In Kaveripakkam, 9% of the population is under 6 years of age.

Attractions
Kaveripakkam has a lake built by King Nandivarman III of Pallava dynasty. This place was called 'Kavithapakkam' during the reign of the Pallavas. Recent excavations have unearthed 16th century artifacts such as pottery materials and burnt clay products. These artifacts are now displayed at Government Museum in Vellore.

Kaveripakkam lake is the second largest lake in Tamil Nadu. This lake irrigates more than 30 villages.

Location
On the northern banks of the Palar River, Kaveripakkam is a town in Ranipet District of Tamil Nadu. This town, also known as Kaveripak, is 10 km east of Walajapet and 30 km from Kanchipuram.

Kaveripakkam is about 100 km west of Chennai, 40 km east of Vellore and 28 km west of Kanchipuram. Kaveripakkam has more than 50 small villages around the town. Kaveripakkam is the entry town of Vellore Dist

Politics
This town is part of the Sholingur (state assembly constituency) and Arakkonam (Lok Sabha constituency).

Economy 
Plantain is the most predominant crop in Kaveripakkam followed by rice and sugarcane. Banana fruit and banana tree products are very famous all over the district and state. Till about 70/80 years back betel leaves and Agathi leaves used to be grown in abundance.

Transport
Kaveripakkam is 40 km from Vellore and 78 km west of Chennai International Airport. The nearest rail access points are Walajah Road Junction Railway Station and Sholinghur Railway Station.

Nearest airport: Chennai
Nearest seaport: Chennai
Nearest railway station: Sholingur (Banavaram), Walaja Road
Nearest railway junction: Katpadi, Arakonam
Buses via Chennai to Vellore, Chennai to Arcot, Chennai to Thirupathur, Chennai to Ambur, Chennai to Gudiyatham as well from Tambaram and Kanchipuram will go via Kaveripakkam.

Education

Colleges
Matheri Teachers Training Institute
Kaveripakkam College of Arts & Science
Shri Sapthagiri Institute of Technology

Schools
Government Boys Higher Secondary School
Government Girls Higher Secondary School
Saraswathi Vidhyalaya Matric Higher Sec School, kaveripakkam
Swamy Vivekananda Vidyalaya Matric School
Bharathidhasanar Matric Higher Sec School
Vedavalli Vidhyalaya Hr.sec school, Bagaveli
SunBeam Matric Higher Sec School & SunBeam(CBSE) Sr.Sec.School, Sumaithangi
Anne Marie Matric Hr.Sec. School, Thiruparkadal
Golden Growth Vidyalaya CBSE

Notable residents
 Ariyanatha Mudaliar, the Prime Minister of Krishnadevaroya was born in Kaveripakkam.
 Vasuki, the wife of Tamil poet-philosopher Valluvar.
 K.V.Sambandam M.A.B.L, Administrator General and Official Trustee, formerly District Court Judge

References

Cities and towns in Vellore district
Palar River